Rene Ferdinands (born 3 May 1969) is a New Zealand cricketer. He played in one first-class match for Northern Districts in 1998/99.

See also
 List of Northern Districts representative cricketers

References

External links
 

1969 births
Living people
New Zealand cricketers
Northern Districts cricketers
Cricketers from Colombo
New Zealand people of Sri Lankan descent